The Earnest Bridge, located near Marcola, Oregon, is listed on the National Register of Historic Places. The name is spelled Ernest Bridge in some documents, including the NRHP listing, but spelled Earnest Bridge in the NRHP nomination and in signage on the bridge itself.

See also
 List of bridges on the National Register of Historic Places in Oregon
 National Register of Historic Places listings in Lane County, Oregon

References

1938 establishments in Oregon
Covered bridges on the National Register of Historic Places in Oregon
Covered bridges in Lane County, Oregon
National Register of Historic Places in Lane County, Oregon
Road bridges on the National Register of Historic Places in Oregon
Wooden bridges in Oregon